The Central Ontario Junior C Hockey League was a junior ice hockey league in Ontario, Canada, sanctioned by the Ontario Hockey Association.  The "Central" played inter-league games with the Empire Junior "C" League.  The champion of the Central competed for the All-Ontario Championship and the Clarence Schmalz Cup.  The league is now a division in the Provincial Junior Hockey League.

History

In 1970, the Suburban Junior C Hockey League divided into two leagues.  Most of the westerly teams formed the Mid-Ontario Junior B Hockey League, while most of the easterly teams formed the Central Lakeshore Junior C League.  In 1972, the Eastern Junior B Hockey League was also divided up, half to the Metro Junior B Hockey League and the other half to the Central League.  With this, the Eastern Junior C Loop became the Quinte-St. Lawrence Junior C Hockey League, the Central League's main territorial rival until 1986.

In 1986, the Quinte-St. Lawrence League folded.  The Wellington Dukes fled to the Central League and the Gananoque Islanders joined the Ottawa District Hockey Association's Eastern Ontario Junior B Hockey League.

With a plethora of major towns in the league: Trenton, Ajax, Bowmanville, Port Hope, Lindsay, Cobourg, and the retirement community-backed Wellington Dukes; the Central Junior B Hockey League absorbed many of these franchises over the course of a couple years in their run to Junior A status—obtained in 1993.

Since losing half of their teams, the Central Ontario League has survived with the likes of Georgina, Lakefield, Little Britain, Port Perry, and Uxbridge.  A sixth team has failed to stick in most cases, in towns like Bobcaygeon and Madoc.  Due to retraction in the Ontario Junior Hockey League, the Bowmanville Eagles have returned in 2011 in the form of the Clarington Eagles but Ajax remains unserviced after their team left Junior A, both having folded in 2010.

Following the 2015-16 seasons the Central Ontario Junior C Hockey League amalgamated with the other southern Ontario junior "C" hockey leagues and became a division within the Provincial Junior Hockey League.

The teams

2015-2016 league playoffs
For the Ontario Hockey Association "All-Ontario Jr. "C" Championship", please go to the Clarence Schmalz Cup.

Cougar Cup champions

Regular season champions

Former member teams
 Ajax Axemen
 Bobcaygeon Bullets
 Bowmanville Eagles
 Brighton Bruins
 Cobourg Cougars
 Lindsay Muskies
 Madoc Hurricanes
 Port Hope Panthers
 Stouffville Clippers
 Trenton Golden Hawks
 Wellington Dukes

See also
 Provincial Junior Hockey League, for the PJHL Orr Division
 Clarence Schmalz Cup, for the Ontario Hockey Association All-Ontario Jr. "C" Championship

External links
 OHA Website

Ice hockey leagues in Ontario
C
Sports leagues established in 1970
1970 establishments in Ontario